This is a list of all the United States Supreme Court cases from volume 352 of the United States Reports:

External links

1956 in United States case law
1957 in United States case law